The White Earth Band of the Minnesota Chippewa Tribe, also called the White Earth Nation ("People from where there is an abundance of white clay"), is a federally recognized Native American band located in northwestern Minnesota. The band's land base is the White Earth Indian Reservation. 

With 19,291 members in 2007, the White Earth Band is the largest of the six component bands of the federally recognized Minnesota Chippewa Tribe, formed after the 1934 Indian Reorganization Act. It is also the largest band in the state of Minnesota.

The five other member tribe of the Minnesota Chippewa Tribe are the Bois Forte Band (Nett Lake), Fond du Lac Band, Grand Portage Band, Leech Lake Band, and Mille Lacs Band.

History
On March 19, 1867, the US Congress established the White Earth Indian Reservation for the Mississippi Chippewa Indians in Minnesota, following the ratification of a treaty between them and the United States. Congress had several session agreements regarding the White Earth Band of Ojibwe. After hearing many complaints about the Pillagers, who were then landless, Congress authorized the relocation of the western Pillagers to the White Earth Indian Reservation. They had not been included in the 1855 Treaty of Washington, which was made with the eastern Pillagers at the Mississippi River headwaters. Eventually, the Otter Tail Pillager Band of Chippewa Indians and Wild Rice River Pembina Band of Chippewa Indians also came to settle alongside the Mississippi Chippewa at White Earth Reservation and effectively became part of the White Earth Band.

Historically, the tribe was formed from the unification of Ojibwe bands from the northern part of Minnesota who were displaced by European settlement.

These historic bands were:
 Gull Lake Band of Mississippi River Chippewa
 Removable Mille Lacs Indians
 Rabbit Lake Band of Mississippi River Chippewa
 Rice Lake Band of Mississippi River Chippewa.

Up until the Indian Reorganization Act of 1934, the six historical component bands located on the White Earth Indian Reservation acted independently of each other. Following the Reorganization Act, the six wrote a constitution to form the Minnesota Chippewa Tribe. They divided Minnesota into six Band districts, and unified those scattered Ojibwe bands that were not associated with the Red Lake Band of Chippewa, which did not join the tribe.

The component bands located on the White Earth Indian Reservation were unified into the single White Earth Band of Ojibwe of today. The six Minnesota Chippewa Tribe bands continue to enroll members separately, but also combine their numbers for the entire tribe. According to the Minnesota Chippewa Tribe, the White Earth Band had 19,291 enrolled members in July 2007. It is the largest of the six bands in the Tribe, and the largest of any band in the state.

The tribe was involved in a case about how much compensation the descendants of the Pembina Chippewa should receive from the taking of land by the U.S. government during the early 1800s. The third and final settlement payment in 2022 of $59 million was split among the tribe, the Little Shell Chippewa, the Chippewa Cree, and the Turtle Mountain Tribe of North Dakota along with the 39,000 individual beneficiaries. Previous settlements in the case were in 1964 and 1980.

Notable citizens

 Kathleen Annette, physician, health administrator
 Clyde Bellecourt (White Earth Ojibwe), social activist
 Vernon Bellecourt, activist and early leader of the American Indian Movement, founded in Minneapolis 
 Charles Albert Bender - athlete and baseball pitcher, elected in 1953 to Baseball Hall of Fame
 Peggy Flanagan, lieutenant governor and former Minnesota State Representative (D-46A)
 Joe Guyon - Professional Football Hall of Fame, College Football Hall of Fame
 Gordon Henry Jr., poet, writer
 Clara Sue Kidwell, Director of the American Indian Center, University of North Carolina at Chapel Hill
 Winona LaDuke, founder of the White Earth Land Recovery Project in 1989, to purchase land for the tribe within the reservation boundaries, work for reforestation, and market traditional products, including wild rice; also two-time Green Party vice presidential nominee.
 Robert Lilligren, first American Indian tribal member to serve on the Minneapolis City Council
 Anne McKeig, attorney and judge, appointed in June 2016 as the first Native American on the Minnesota State Supreme Court
 Jean O'Brien, historian who specializes in northeastern Woodlands American Indian history.
 T. J. Oshie, National Hockey League player and member of the 2014 USA Olympic Men's Hockey team

 Charlie Roy, professional baseball player in 1906
 Gerald Vizenor, scholar and writer
 Wabanquot (White Cloud), chief in the 19th century

References

Further reading

External links
 White Earth Nation
 Bemaadizing: An Interdisciplinary Journal of Indigenous Life (An online journal)
 Eni–gikendaasoyang "Moving Towards Knowledge Together", Center for Indigenous Knowledge and Language Revitalization
 White Earth Tribal & Community College

 
Ojibwe governments
Native American tribes in Minnesota